This is a list of articles in continental philosophy.

 Abandonment (existentialism)
 Abjection
 Absurdism
 Achieving Our Country
 Albert Camus
 Alberto Moreiras
 Albrecht Wellmer
 Alexandru Dragomir
 Alfred Adler
 Allan Bloom
 Alterity
 Always already
 Anarchism and Friedrich Nietzsche
 André Malet (philosopher)
 Ángel Rama
 Angst
 Anguish
 Anna-Teresa Tymieniecka
 Answering the Question: What Is Enlightenment?
 Anti-Semite and Jew
 Antonio Caso Andrade
 Aous Shakra
 Apperception
 Arborescent
 Atheist existentialism
 Aufheben
 Aurel Kolnai
 Authenticity (philosophy)
 Autonomism
 Avital Ronell
 Ayyavazhi phenomenology
 Bad faith (existentialism)
 Barbara Herrnstein Smith
 Beatriz Sarlo
 Being and Nothingness
 Being and Time
 Being in itself
 Benedetto Croce
 Beyond Good and Evil
 Black existentialism
 Boredom
 Bracketing (phenomenology)
 Cahiers pour l'Analyse
 Carmen Laforet
 Cartesian Meditations
 Charles Sanders Peirce
 Christian Discourses
 Christian existentialism
 Christopher Norris (critic)
 Citationality
 Claude Lefort
 Claudio Canaparo
 Colin Wilson
 Concluding Unscientific Postscript to Philosophical Fragments
 Consciousness
 Constantin Noica
 Continental philosophy
 Contributions to Philosophy (From Enowning)
 Cornelius Castoriadis
 Course in General Linguistics
 Critical discourse analysis
 Critical historiography
 Critical pedagogy
 Critical theory
 Criticism of postmodernism
 Critique of Cynical Reason
 Critique of Dialectical Reason
 Critique of Pure Reason
 Critiques of Slavoj Žižek
 Cultural materialism (anthropology)
 Cultural studies
 Cyborg theory
 Dasein
 David Farrell Krell
 Deconstruction
 Delfim Santos
 Dermot Moran
 Discontinuity (Postmodernism)
 Discourse ethics
 Duality of structure
 Ecce Homo (book)
 Eco-criticism
 Écriture féminine
 Edifying Discourses in Diverse Spirits
 Edith Wyschogrod
 Edmund Husserl
 Edward Said
 Egoist anarchism
 Either/Or
 Epic and Novel
 Epoché
 Eranos
 Ernst Cassirer
 Eugen Rosenstock-Huessy
 Eve Kosofsky Sedgwick
 Exceptionalism
 Exile and the Kingdom
 Existential crisis
 Existential humanism
 Existential phenomenology
 Existentiell
 Face-to-face
 Facticity
 Fear and Trembling
 Ferdinand de Saussure
 For Self-Examination
 Foucault–Habermas debate
 Franz Rosenzweig
 Frederick C. Beiser
 Fredric Jameson
 French structuralist feminism
 Freudo-Marxism
 Friedrich Nietzsche
 Friedrich Nietzsche bibliography
 Friedrich Pollock
 Friedrich Wilhelm Joseph Schelling
 Gabriel Marcel
 Gayatri Chakravorty Spivak
 Geist
 Gender studies
 Genealogy (philosophy)
 Geocriticism
 Geoffrey Bennington
 Georg Wilhelm Friedrich Hegel
 Giles Fraser
 Giorgio Agamben
 Guy Debord
 Hans Lipps
 Hans-Georg Gadamer
 Hegelianism
 Hélène Cixous
 Helene von Druskowitz
 Henri Bergson
 Herbert Marcuse
 Hermeneutics
 Heteronormativity
 Heterophenomenology
 Historicity (philosophy)
 History of Consciousness
 Honorio Delgado
 Human, All Too Human
 Humanistic psychology
 Husserliana
 Hypermodernity
 Idea for a Universal History with a Cosmopolitan Purpose
 Igor Pribac
 Influence and reception of Friedrich Nietzsche
 Influence and reception of Søren Kierkegaard
 Instrumental rationality
 International Journal of Žižek Studies
 Intersubjectivity
 Irrational Man: A Study in Existential Philosophy
 Irrealism (the arts)
 Jacques Derrida
 Jacques Lacan
 James E. Faulconer
 James M. Edie
 Jan Patočka
 Jean Grenier
 Jean-François Lyotard
 Jean-Luc Nancy
 Jean-Paul Sartre
 Jeff Malpas
 Jena romantics
 Johann Gottlieb Fichte
 John D. Caputo
 Josefina Ayerza
 Juan-David Nasio
 Judge for Yourselves!
 Judith Butler
 Juha Varto
 Julia Kristeva
 Julie Rivkin
 Jürgen Habermas
 Karl Ameriks
 Karl Wilhelm Friedrich Schlegel
 Keiji Nishitani
 L'existentialisme est un humanisme
 Lacan at the Scene
 Laura Kipnis
 Leo Strauss
 Léon Dumont
 Les jeux sont faits
 Les Temps modernes
 Lewis White Beck
 Lifeworld
 List of critical theorists
 List of postmodern critics
 List of works in critical theory
 Literary criticism
 Literary theory
 Lived body
 Logocentrism
 Logos: A Journal of Modern Society and Culture
 Louis Althusser
 Louis H. Mackey
 Luce Irigaray
 Ludwig Landgrebe
 Man's Fate
 Marek Siemek
 Mark Sacks
 Mark Wrathall
 Marshall Berman
 Martin Buber
 Martin Heidegger
 Mary Louise Pratt
 Maurice Merleau-Ponty
 Max Horkheimer
 Maxence Caron
 Metaphor in philosophy
 Metaphysical Foundations of Natural Science
 Metaphysics of Morals
 Metaphysics of presence
 Michael Vavrus
 Michel Foucault bibliography
 Michel Henry
 Mikhail Ovsyannikov
 Minima Moralia
 Mirror stage
 Modalities (sociology)
 Modernism
 Mythologies (book)
 Nader El-Bizri
 Nelly Richard
 Néstor García Canclini
 Nicola Abbagnano
 Nietzsche and free will
 Nietzsche and Philosophy
 Nietzsche contra Wagner
 Nietzsche's views on women
 Nietzschean affirmation
 Nouvelle theologie
 Objet petit a
 Observations on the Feeling of the Beautiful and Sublime
 On the Concept of Irony with Continual Reference to Socrates
 On the Genealogy of Morality
 On Truth and Lies in a Nonmoral Sense
 Ontic
 Orientalism (book)
 Orthotes
 Outline of critical theory
 Paul de Man
 Paul R. Patton
 Paul Rée
 Per Martin-Löf
 Phenomenological Sociology
 Phenomenology (philosophy)
 Phenomenology of essences
 Phenomenology of Perception
 Philippe Lacoue-Labarthe
 Philippe Nys
 Philosophical Fragments
 Philosophical Inquiries into the Essence of Human Freedom
 Philosophy and Phenomenological Research
 Philosophy in the Tragic Age of the Greeks
 Philosophy of dialogue
 Philosophy of Existence
 Philosophy of Max Stirner
 Philosophy of Søren Kierkegaard
 Philosophy of technology
 Pirmin Stekeler-Weithofer
 Post-left anarchy
 Post-Marxism
 Post-structuralism
 Postcolonialism
 Posthegemony
 Postmodern Christianity
 Postmodern philosophy
 Postmodern psychology
 Postmodern social construction of nature
 Postmodern vertigo
 Postmodernism
 Postmodernism, or, the Cultural Logic of Late Capitalism
 Practice in Christianity
 Pragmatic maxim
 Prefaces
 Private sphere
 Prolegomena to Any Future Metaphysics
 Public sphere
 Queer heterosexuality
 Queer pedagogy
 Queer theory
 Ranjana Khanna
 Reflective disclosure
 Relationship between Friedrich Nietzsche and Max Stirner
 Repetition (Kierkegaard)
 Repressive hypothesis
 Res Extensa
 Ressentiment
 Richard A. Macksey
 Richard Schacht
 Robert C. Solomon
 Robert Rowland Smith
 Roger Caillois
 Romanticism
 Rudolf Schottlaender
 Rudolf Seydel
 Russian formalism
 Saint Genet
 Sarah Coakley
 Scheler's Stratification of Emotional Life
 Schizoanalysis
 Schopenhauer's criticism of the proofs of the parallel postulate
 Search for a Method
 Secondary antisemitism
 Self-deception
 Semeiotic
 Siegfried Kracauer
 Situationist International
 Sketch for a Theory of the Emotions
 Slavoj Žižek
 Slavoj Žižek bibliography
 Social alienation
 Socialisme ou Barbarie
 Søren Kierkegaard
 Søren Kierkegaard and Friedrich Nietzsche
 Sous rature
 Spomenka Hribar
 Stages on Life's Way
 Stephen Mulhall
 Strategic essentialism
 Structural Marxism
 Sturm und Drang
 Sublime (philosophy)
 Telos (journal)
 Teresa de Lauretis
 The Absence of the Book
 The Adulterous Woman
 The Antichrist (book)
 The Art of Being Right
 The Birth of the Clinic
 The Birth of Tragedy
 The Blood of Others
 The Book on Adler
 The Case of Wagner
 The Concept of Anxiety
 The Crisis and a Crisis in the Life of an Actress
 The Existential Negation Campaign
 The False Subtlety of the Four Syllogistic Figures
 The Gay Science
 The Imaginary (Sartre)
 The Metamorphosis
 The Myth of Sisyphus
 The Only Possible Argument in Support of a Demonstration of the Existence of God
 The Origin of the Work of Art
 The Pigeon (novella)
 The Plague
 The Point of View of My Work as an Author
 The Possessed (play)
 The Postmodern Condition
 The Question Concerning Technology
 The Renegade (Camus short story)
 The Royal Way
 The Seminars of Jacques Lacan
 The Sickness Unto Death
 The Silent Men
 The Society of the Spectacle
 The Stranger (Camus novel)
 The Sublime Object of Ideology
 The Transcendence of the Ego
 The Will to Power (manuscript)
 Theatre of the Absurd
 Theodor W. Adorno
 Thoughts on the True Estimation of Living Forces
 Thus Spoke Zarathustra
 Tim Dean
 Time and Free Will
 Tomonubu Imamichi
 Trace (deconstruction)
 Tui (intellectual)
 Twilight of the Idols
 Two Ages: A Literary Review
 Universal Natural History and Theory of Heaven
 Untimely Meditations (Nietzsche)
 Vanja Sutlić
 Waiting for Godot
 Waking Life
 Walter Benjamin
 What Is Literature?
 Wilhelm Dilthey
 William McNeill (philosopher)
 Wolfgang Fritz Haug
 Works of Love
 World disclosure
 Writing Sampler
 Zarathustra's roundelay
 Zollikon Seminars

 
Continental